The 2020–21 Merrimack Warriors men's basketball team represented Merrimack College in the 2020–21 NCAA Division I men's basketball season. The Warriors, led by fifth-year head coach Joe Gallo, will play their home games at Hammel Court in North Andover, Massachusetts as second-year members of the Northeast Conference (NEC).

Previous season
The Warriors finished the 2019–20 season 20–11, 14–4 in NEC play to finish as NEC regular season champions. In doing so, they became the first program in NCAA men's basketball history to win an outright conference regular season title in its first season of Division I reclassification. However, due to their transition from Division II to Division I, they were ineligible to participate in the NEC tournament, and aren't eligible to do so until 2024. They were a candidate for an invitation to the 2020 CollegeInsider.com Postseason Tournament. However, the CIT, and all postseason tournaments, were cancelled amid the COVID-19 pandemic.

Roster

Schedule and results 

|-
!colspan=12 style=| Northeast Conference regular season

|-

Source

References

Merrimack Warriors men's basketball seasons
Merrimack Warriors
Merrimack Warriors men's basketball
Merrimack Warriors men's basketball